Microspathodon is a genus of fish in the family Pomacentridae.

Species
There are four species in the genus:

Microspathodon bairdii (Gill, 1862)
Microspathodon chrysurus (Cuvier in Cuvier and Valenciennes, 1830)
Microspathodon dorsalis (Gill, 1862)   
Microspathodon frontatus Emery, 1970

References

 
Pomacentrinae
Marine fish genera
Taxa named by Albert Günther